The  is an open-air ice rink in the city of  Kōriyama in Fukushima prefecture in Japan. It was opened in 1993 for the National Sports Festival of Japan (Kokutai) in Fukushima in 1995. It is located at 340 meters above sea level. The track serves as a roller-skating rink during the summer.

Every year the so-called Tsururinko festival takes place on the first Sunday of December, with the main attraction being a tug-of-war on skates.

Track records

These are the current track records at the Koriyama Skating Rink.

References

Ice skating in Japan
Sports venues in Fukushima Prefecture
Kōriyama